This is a list of the  Hindu temples, centers, and ashrams in the United States as of 2022.

History
Following his famous speech at the Parliament of the World's Religions in Chicago, Swami Vivekananda established Vedanta Societies in New York City and San Francisco in the 1890s. The Vedanta Society built its first temple, called the Old Temple, in North America in San Francisco in 1905. This temple has evolved into a bona fide Hindu temple. Through the 1930s and 1940s, Vedanta Societies were also established in Boston, Los Angeles, Portland, Providence, Chicago, St. Louis, and Seattle. Although the Society's membership was relatively small, it paved the way for the later rise in popularity of yoga in the United States.

Paramahansa Yogananda also came to the United States to attend a conference in 1920 and established the Self Realization Fellowship. Promoting yoga through his book Autobiography of a Yogi, he opened centers throughout the country. By the 1950s, the Self Realization Fellowship had become the most prominent Hindu organization in America. Its international headquarters Self-Realization Fellowship Lake Shrine opened in California in 1950.

The rise of counterculture of the 1960s in the United States saw the arrival of many gurus and swamis from India. The most prominent of these were Maharishi Mahesh Yogi, A. C. Bhaktivedanta Swami Prabhupada, Swami Satchidananda, Swami Rama, and Swami Muktananda. In the 1960s and 1970s, these and other teachers established centers, temples, and ashrams, many of which continue to the present day.

The Immigration and Nationality Act of 1965 facilitated a significant increase in Indian immigration. The Hindu students and professionals who immigrated in the late 1960s and 1970s often kept small altars and puja rooms in their homes. These altars became the first makeshift temples of the early immigrants. As these immigrants started raising families, they began taking active steps to preserve their culture and heritage. They formed religious communities such as the Swaminarayan Sampradaya and cultural organizations such as Bengali, Gujarati, Marathi, Odisha, Tamil, Telugu, and India Associations. Many of these associations rented halls, churches, and school auditoriums to celebrate Hindu festivals such as Diwali, Holi, and Navaratri. The religious groups often met in members' homes to study the scriptures, conduct pujas, or sing bhajans (devotional songs).

By the 1970s, the religious groups and cultural associations started working together to create Hindu "temple societies." These societies formed in metropolitan areas with large Indian American populations such as Atlanta, Boston, Chicago, Detroit, Houston, Los Angeles, New York, Pittsburgh, the San Francisco Bay Area, and Washington D.C. The goal of the societies was to create permanent temples by purchasing existing properties such as private homes, former churches, warehouses, and office buildings, or by buying land and constructing new temples "from scratch." The Sri Venkateswara Temple, Pittsburgh, inaugurated on June 8, 1977, and the Hindu Temple Society of North America in New York, consecrated on July 4, 1977, became the first Hindu temples in the U.S. built by Indian immigrants. In the 1980s and 1990s, temples were built in nearly all major metropolitan areas.

In the 21st century, Hindu temples have been established in many smaller cities and towns, and larger metropolitan areas have continued to add temples, as seen in the list below. In the meantime, older temples have been expanded and/or renovated to include kitchens, dining areas, community halls, and auditoriums to meet the growing needs of their congregations.

List of temples

Locations of all temples having coordinates may be seen together in a map linked from "Map all coordinates using OpenStreetMap" on the right of this page.

Alabama

Alaska

Arizona

Arkansas

California

Colorado

Connecticut

Delaware

Florida

Georgia

Guam

Hawaii

Idaho

Illinois

Indiana

Iowa

Kansas

Kentucky

Louisiana

Maine

Maryland

Massachusetts

Michigan

Minnesota

Mississippi

Missouri

Nebraska

Nevada

New Hampshire

New Jersey

New Mexico

New York

North Carolina

Ohio

Oklahoma

Oregon

Pennsylvania

Puerto Rico

Rhode Island

South Carolina

South Dakota

Tennessee

Texas

Utah

Vermont

Virginia

Washington

West Virginia

Wisconsin

See also 

List of Hindu temples
List of Hindu temples in Canada
List of Hindu temples outside India
:Category:Converts to Hinduism
Hindu American Foundation
Hindu denominations
Hindu University of America
Hinduism in the United States
Hinduism in the West
Indians in the New York City metropolitan area

Notes

References

External links
 Council of Hindu Temples of North America - CHTNA
 Hindu Temples in USA
 List of Hindu Temples
 Hindu Temples Directory Showing All the Hindu Temples in the USA and giving their address, contact details and opening hours

Temples
Hindu temples
Hindu
United States